Melanaphis is a genus of true bugs belonging to the family Aphididae.

The genus has cosmopolitan distribution, native to the Old World, far more diverse in southeastern Asia.

Species:

Melanaphis arthraxonophaga 
Melanaphis arundinariae 
Melanaphis bambusae 
Melanaphis daisenensis 
Melanaphis donacis 
Melanaphis elizabethae 
Melanaphis graminisucta 
Melanaphis grossisiphonellus 
Melanaphis jamatonica 
Melanaphis japonica 
Melanaphis koreana 
Melanaphis luzulella 
Melanaphis meghalayensis
Melanaphis miscanthi 
Melanaphis montana 
Melanaphis pahanensis 
Melanaphis pyraria 
Melanaphis pyrisucta 
Melanaphis sacchari 
Melanaphis siphonella 
Melanaphis sorini 
Melanaphis strobilanthi
Melanaphis tateyamaensis 
Melanaphis yasumatsui 
Melanaphis zhanhuaensis

References

Aphididae